Dana Olsen is an American actor, film producer and screenwriter. He is the co-creator of Henry Danger alongside Dan Schneider. His written works include George of the Jungle, The 'Burbs and Inspector Gadget.

Career 

Olsen wrote It Came from Hollywood (1982) directed by filmmakers Malcolm Leo and Andrew Solt. He wrote and produced The 'Burbs directed by Joe Dante. In Making the Grade, he played Palmer Woodrow, making it his second acting film after Ron Howard's Splash (1984). Olsen also wrote Inspector Gadget (1999) based on the media franchise of the same name. In 2014, Olsen, along with television producer Dan Schneider, created the Nickelodeon television series Henry Danger.

Filmography

Writer
Joanie Loves Chachi ("Fonzie's Visit" episode, 1982)
It Came from Hollywood (1982)
Wacko (1982)
Going Berserk (1983)
The 'Burbs (1989)
Memoirs of an Invisible Man (1992)
George of the Jungle (1997)
Sammy the Screenplay (1997) 
Inspector Gadget (1999)
Henry Danger (co-creator, 2014–2020)

Actor
Splash (1984) .... Man arguing outside the market
Making the Grade (1984) .... Palmer Woodrow
The 'Burbs (1989) .... Cop
Sammy the Screenplay (1997) ... Sr. Executive
Rat Race (2001) ... Dad seen backstage at the end of movie

Producer
The 'Burbs (1989) (co-producer)

References

External links

Living people
American male film actors
American male screenwriters
American male television actors
Showrunners
Place of birth missing (living people)
Year of birth missing (living people)